You Can't Save Yourself Alone is a 2015 Italian romantic drama film  directed by Sergio Castellitto. It is based on a novel with the same name written by Margaret Mazzantini. The film received three nominations at the 2015 David di Donatello Awards, for best actor, best actress and best original song ("'Ellis").

Plot
Gaetano and Delia are a separate couple who find themselves at a restaurant table. With apparent disinterest in each other, they have to discuss the summer holidays of their children Cosmo and Nico, who live with Delia, while Gaetano is staying in a residence.

During the discussion, the two experience several flashbacks that make them understand their past.

The two had met when they were very young: the birth of the children, the first problems, also linked to the conflicting relationships of Delia with her mother and Gaetano with her father, some events that traumatize the children, the voluntary abortion of the third child. At the moment of separation Delia is about to fall into anorexia and her frustration falls on Cosmo, while Gaetano, overwhelmed by too much work, does not take care of the children sufficiently.

When dinner is about to end, two elderly people, Vito and Lea, who have overheard the conversation between Delia and Gaetano, approach. The elderly still seem very much in love and their mutual respect "is tangible". Vito says he is ill with cancer and asks the two young people to pray for him, explaining to them that "nobody saves himself alone".

Cast 
Riccardo Scamarcio as Gaetano
Jasmine Trinca as Delia
Roberto Vecchioni as Vito
Ángela Molina as Lea
Anna Galiena as Viola
Eliana Miglio as Serena
Marina Rocco as Matilde
Massimo Bonetti as Luigi
Massimo Ciavarro as Fulvio

See also   
 List of Italian films of 2015

References

External links 

2015 films
2015 romantic drama films
Films directed by Sergio Castellitto
Italian romantic drama films
2010s Italian films